Kinwar is a clan whose members belong  to the Rajput and Bhumihar caste.  the Rajput members principally reside in the states of Bihar and Eastern Uttar Pradesh. A particularly large population of Kinwar Bhumihars can be found in Ghazipur district.

The founders of the Kharagpur Raj principality in Bihar were Kinwar Rajputs.

References

Rajput clans of Uttar Pradesh
Rajput clans of Bihar
Bhumihar clans